Cringle Moor (also known as Cranimoor), at 432 m (1,417 ft), is the third highest hill in the North York Moors, England, and the highest point west of Clay Bank.

The hill is crossed by the Cleveland Way National Trail and is a part of Wainwright's Coast to Coast Walk, which also passes over the neighbouring tops of Cold Moor, Carlton Moor, Live Moor and Hasty Bank — a section of the walk which Alfred Wainwright described as "one of the finest". It is also part of the Lyke Wake Walk.

Just to the west of the summit is the burial mound of 'Drake Howe (Howe is an Old Norse word meaning burial mound). This is a Bronze Age burial mound that is now a scheduled ancient monument.

Gallery

References

External links

Marilyns of England
Mountains and hills of North Yorkshire
North York Moors